Capodaglio is an Italian surname. Notable people with the surname include:

Anna Capodaglio (1879–1961), Italian actress
Wanda Capodaglio (1889–1980), Italian actress, sister of Anna
Miranda Campa, born Liliana Campa Capodaglio

Italian-language surnames